This Is Not a Safe Place is the sixth studio album by English rock band Ride. The album was released on 16 August 2019, the date being announced on 23 April 2019 along with the release of the album's first single, "Future Love". The album is the band's second produced by English DJ Erol Alkan.

The album cover includes three slashes (///), which is based upon historic graffiti by hobos to indicate an unsafe place.

Andy Bell stated that the album was influenced by the likes of Sonic Youth and the Fall  and by "post-punk in general, Siouxsie and the Banshees, Public Image Ltd".

Track listing

Personnel 

Ride
 Mark Gardener – lead vocals, guitar
 Andy Bell – vocals, guitar
 Steve Queralt – bass guitars
 Loz Colbert – drums, percussion

Additional personnel
 Erol Alkan – producing
 Alan Moulder – mixing
 Caesar Edmund – mixing

Charts

References 

2019 albums
Ride (band) albums
PIAS Recordings albums
Wichita Recordings albums
Albums produced by Erol Alkan